The Europe/Africa Zone was one of three zones of regional competition in the 2003 Fed Cup.

Group I
Venue: Estoril, Portugal (outdoor clay) 
Date: 21–26 April

The seventeen teams were divided into three pools of four teams and one pool of five. The top teams of each pool played-off against the second-placed teams to decide which four nations progress to World Group Play-offs. The four nations coming last in the pools were relegated to Group II for 2004.

Pools

Play-offs

Group II
Venue: Estoril, Portugal (outdoor clay) 
Date: 28 April – 3 May

The thirteen teams were divided into three pools each of three teams and one pool of four. The top teams of each pool were randomly drawn against each other in two play-offs to decide which two teams advanced to Group I for 2004.

Pools

Play-offs

  and  advanced to Group I for 2004.

See also
Fed Cup structure

References

 Fed Cup Profile, Switzerland
 Fed Cup Profile, Belarus
 Fed Cup Profile, Estonia
 Fed Cup Profile, Israel
 Fed Cup Profile, Yugoslavia
 Fed Cup Profile, Bulgaria
 Fed Cup Profile, South Africa
 Fed Cup Profile, Ukraine
 Fed Cup Profile, Denmark
 Fed Cup Profile, Hungary
 Fed Cup Profile, Poland
 Fed Cup Profile, Great Britain
 Fed Cup Profile, Netherlands
 Fed Cup Profile, Malta
 Fed Cup Profile, Portugal
 Fed Cup Profile, Lithuania
 Fed Cup Profile, Turkey
 Fed Cup Profile, Latvia
 Fed Cup Profile, Algeria
 Fed Cup Profile, Finland
 Fed Cup Profile, Botswana
 Fed Cup Profile, Egypt

External links
 Fed Cup website

 
Europe Africa
Sport in Estoril
Tennis tournaments in Portugal
2003 in Portuguese tennis